Katherine Corrigan is a fictional character from the Hellboy and B.P.R.D. comic book series published by Dark Horse Comics and created by Mike Mignola. Her appearance is based on Mignola's wife, Christine. Within the world of the comics, dubbed the "Mignola-verse", Corrigan acts as B.P.R.D. field leader to "enhanced" agents including Hellboy (before abandoning the Bureau), Abe Sapien, Roger the Homunculus, Liz Sherman and Johann Kraus.

History
Dr. Kate Corrigan first appeared in The Wolves of St. August (set in May 1994) as a foil to Hellboy. She is described as a professor of history at New York University (specializing in folklore) before she joined the B.P.R.D. in 1984 as a consultant. She is said to have written sixteen books on folklore and occult history, including the confessions of Isobel Gowdie. In it, she and Hellboy investigated the mass murders in the small European village of Griart. Kate uses her extensive knowledge of folklore to deduce that the village must be St. August and that the killings are being performed by werewolves. She encounters her first ghost on this mission, as well as a werewolf that nearly kills her before being slain by Hellboy.

Corrigan was promoted to a regular cast member of B.P.R.D. during the Plague of Frogs arc. In the book, she serves as the special liaison to the 'enhanced talents' agents, or those that command superhuman abilities. These include such prominent characters as Abe Sapien, Liz Sherman, and Johann Kraus.

Corrigan was the featured star of the mini-series B.P.R.D.: The Universal Machine. Seeking to restore Roger the homunculus to life, Kate was captured by an ageless marquis who wished to trade her for Roger's corpse. She was able to escape by destroying a ring belonging to King Solomon, which held the demon Marchosias in thrall. The demon razed the marquis' treasures and carried him off to Hell. Kate barely escaped with her life, her mission a failure.

Corrigan coordinates an investigation with inspector Bruno Karhu when the war on frogs brings the BPRD to Munich, Germany. Bruno asks Corrigan out on a date in the remains of a decimated Munich, beginning a long distance relationship between the two. Corrigan turns a mission to Austria into a date/road trip with Bruno and the two stay in touch with one another via video chat. Moments after learning of the death of Hellboy, Carrigan receives a call from Bruno in which he ends their relationship because he feels it is "too complicated" for him.

Dr. Kate Corrigan is slain during the final attack on the B.P.R.D. headquarters after the evacuation, having stayed behind to look after Panya.

In other media
 Kate was one of the main characters of the straight-to-DVD animated film Hellboy: Sword of Storms. She was voiced by Peri Gilpin.
 Kate also appeared in the sequel Hellboy: Blood and Iron but had a much smaller role and only briefed the agents on their mission. She was once again voiced by Peri Gilpin.

References

Hellboy characters
Fictional professors
Fictional characters from New York City
Comics characters introduced in 1993
Characters created by Mike Mignola
Female characters in comics